The 2016 Australian Athletics Championships was the 94th edition of the national championship in outdoor track and field for Australia. It was held from 31 March to 3 April at the Sydney Olympic Park Athletic Centre in Sydney. It served as the selection meeting for Australia at the 2016 Summer Olympics.

The combined track and field events formed part of the 2016 IAAF Combined Events Challenge series.

Results

Men

Women

References

Results
NC Sydney AUS 31 March - 3 April 2016. Tilastopaja.org. Retrieved 2019-07-06.
Australian Track & Field Championships - 2015-16 - Men. Athletics Australia. Retrieved 2020-12-22.
Australian Track & Field Championships - 2015-16 - Women. Athletics Australia. Retrieved 2020-12-22.

External links 
 Athletics Australia website

2016
Australian Athletics Championships
Australian Athletics Championships
Australian Championships
Athletics Championships
Sports competitions in Sydney
2010s in Sydney